The Timken Museum of Art is a fine art museum, established in 1965 and located at 1500 El Prado in Balboa Park in San Diego, California, close to the San Diego Museum of Art.

History

The groundwork for the museum was laid in 1951 when Walter Ames helped sisters Amy and Anne Putnam (nieces and heirs of Henry W. Putnam) to form the nonprofit Putnam Foundation to own and manage their art collection. The sisters had settled in San Diego in the early 20th century and made donations to the San Diego Museum of Art in its early years. At first the Foundation loaned items from its collection to noteworthy museums across the United States. When the Timken Museum opened in 1965, the Putnam Foundation Collection provided its initial material and Walter Ames became its first director.

The museum building stands on the site of the former Home Economy Building, originally designed for the 1915 Panama-California Exposition and later known as the Pan-Pacific Building, the Cafe of the World, and the American Legion Building. That building was torn down in 1963 and replaced by the Timken Museum, which was designed by the architectural firm of Frank L. Hope and Associates and funded by the Timken family. The museum is a white, modern building in marble and bronze housing a five-room gallery.

Shortly after the museum opened, John Walker, of the National Gallery of Art, praised its collection, some of which had been on loan at his institution until the Timken neared completion:

Overview
The museum displays European old master paintings, sculptures, and tapestries under natural light. Supplementing the European holdings are collections of American painting and Russian icons.

Acquisitions have expanded the collection from the original 40 to 60 major works, including ones by American (Copley, Johnson, West, Cole, Bierstadt), Italian (Savoldo, Veronese, Guercino and Savoldo's The Temptation of Saint Anthony), Spanish (Murillo), and French masters (Clouet, Claude, Boucher, Fragonard, David, Corot), as well as works of the Flemish and Dutch schools, including masterpieces by Pieter Brueghel the Elder, Peter Paul Rubens, Anthony van Dyck, and Frans Hals.

In 2015, in honor of the Museum's 50th anniversary, the Timken acquired a Zurbarán 3/4 portrait of St. Francis in meditation.   The Timken is the only San Diego museum with a Rembrandt in its permanent collection.

The museum's founding benefactors, the Putnam sisters, were related to two Revolutionary War generals, Israel Putnam and Rufus Putnam. Coincidentally, one of the museum's most important acquisitions in recent decades is the John Singleton Copley painting of the woman who may well have triggered the Revolutionary War, Margaret Kemble Gage.

Selected works

References

External links

 
 

1965 establishments in California
Art museums established in 1965
Art museums and galleries in California
Balboa Park (San Diego)
Former private collections in the United States
Museums in San Diego